Nafiseh Kohnavard is a multilingual correspondent who is focused on Middle East issues for BBC World Service/ BBC Persian.

She has covered the fight against Islamic State in Iraq and Syria, the siege of Sinjar, Iraq where the terrorist group massacred thousands of people from the Yazidi religious minority, and the battle between Islamic State and the Kurdish Peshmerga for Kobane in Syria. Kohnavard has been based in Turkey, Lebanon, Iraq as well as the UK and spent most of her time for some years on the front lines against Islamic State militants with the Kurdish Peshmarga, Iraqi, US army forces.

Kohnavard was born in Urmia, Iran. She started her career in Tehran and was sacked by hardline President Mahmoud Ahmadinejad from the Persian daily Hamshahri after she asked outgoing president Khatami a few questions in her interview about the "parallel Intelligence services" and Kayhan published articles accusing her of being a spy. 
Kohnavard's work has included human interest stories of people affected by conflicts. Kohnavard told the story of Yazidi women who had children fathered by their ISIS captors in a documentary for BBC Persian and World Service's OUR WORLD program called "Yazidis Secret Children", produced and directed by Katie Arnold. In 2020 the film won the One World Media Award's best TV documentary. The documentary is about Yazidi women who had been taken by IS, forced into sexual slavery and gave birth to children born of rape but for returning to their community they faced a heartbreaking choice: Leaving IS fathered children behind and going back home or keeping their children and leave Yazidi community

References

Living people
BBC people
Year of birth missing (living people)